Mamma Ebe (Mother Ebe) is a 1985 courtroom drama film directed by Carlo Lizzani. It was entered into the main competition at the 42nd Venice International Film Festival, in which Barbara De Rossi won the Pasinetti Award for best actress. Based on real events, the film was poorly received by critics.

Cast 

 Berta D. Dominguez: Mamma Ebe  (credited as Cassandra Domenica)
 Stefania Sandrelli: Sandra Agostini
 Barbara De Rossi: Laura Bonetti
 Ida Di Benedetto: Maria Pia Sturla
 Alessandro Haber: Mario Bonetti
 Laura Betti: Lidia Corradi
 Paolo Bonacelli: Don Paolo Monti
 Giuseppe Cederna: Bruno Corradi
 Carlo Monni: Foschi
 Massimo Sarchielli: Oste
 Luigi Pistilli: Roberto Lavagnino
 Maria Fiore: Mara
 Enzo Robutti: Bishop
 Federico Sangirardi Wardal Nike name Count Federico Wardal : Don Franco

References

External links

1985 films
Italian drama films
1985 drama films
Films directed by Carlo Lizzani
Italian biographical films
1980s Italian-language films
1980s Italian films